Helena "Lea" Nordheim (1 August 1903 – 2 July 1943) was a Dutch gymnast. She won the gold medal as a member of the Dutch gymnastics team at the 1928 Summer Olympics in her native Amsterdam. With her team, she was inducted into the International Jewish Sports Hall of Fame in 1997.

Nordheim was born in Amsterdam and was murdered in the Sobibor extermination camp. As a Jew, she was sent to Westerbork concentration camp in June 1943. Shortly after, Nordheim was deported to Sobibór where she was murdered, together with her husband Abraham and their ten-year-old daughter Rebecca.

See also
 List of select Jewish gymnasts

References

Further reading

External links
 profile
 Commemoration of Helena Nordheim, Yad Vashem website.

1903 births
1943 deaths
Dutch female artistic gymnasts
Jewish gymnasts
Jewish Dutch sportspeople
Gymnasts at the 1928 Summer Olympics
Olympic gold medalists for the Netherlands
Olympic gymnasts of the Netherlands
Gymnasts from Amsterdam
Dutch people who died in Sobibor extermination camp
Dutch civilians killed in World War II
Dutch Jews who died in the Holocaust
Olympic medalists in gymnastics
Medalists at the 1928 Summer Olympics
20th-century Dutch women
International Jewish Sports Hall of Fame inductees